Janine Whyte is an Australian former professional tennis player.

Whyte won a girls' doubles title at the 1971 Australian Open (with Patricia Edwards). She twice played in the women's singles second round at the Australian Open, including in the 1972 tournament when she lost to Evonne Goolagong.

References

External links
 
 

Year of birth missing (living people)
Living people
Australian female tennis players
Australian Open (tennis) junior champions
Grand Slam (tennis) champions in girls' doubles